John Harris (born November 11, 1991) is an American football wide receiver who is currently a free agent. He played college football at Texas. He has been a member of the Philadelphia Eagles, Atlanta Falcons, Brooklyn Bolts (FXFL), Ottawa Redblacks (CFL) and Edmonton Eskimos (CFL).

College career 
Harris was red-shirted in his first year with the Texas Longhorns. In 2011 and 2012 Harris suffered through a series of injuries which limited his play time. In 2014 Harris had a breakout final season with Texas, and was their leading receiver with more than 1,000 receiving yards.

Professional career 
After going undrafted in the 2015 NFL draft Harris signed with the Philadelphia Eagles.

Harris signed with the Ottawa Redblacks (CFL) on May 25, 2016. Harris spent most of the 2016 season on the Redblacks practice roster, before playing in the final game of the regular season, catching 3 passes for 28 yards. He was released by the Redblacks on May 1, 2017 as they trimmed their roster down to 75 players. On May 11, 2017 Harris signed with the Edmonton Eskimos (CFL), ahead of the team's training camp.

References

External links
 Texas profile
 Philadelphia Eagles profile

Living people
American football wide receivers
Canadian football wide receivers
American players of Canadian football
Texas Longhorns football players
Philadelphia Eagles players
People from Garland, Texas
Players of American football from Dallas
Players of Canadian football from Dallas
1991 births
Brooklyn Bolts players
Ottawa Redblacks players
Atlanta Falcons players
Canadian football slotbacks
Edmonton Elks players